Esporte Clube Sírio, abbreviated as E.C. Sírio, is a Brazilian men's professional basketball club that is based in São Paulo, Brazil.

History
Over the years, E.C. Sírio featured basketball players like: Amaury Pasos, Carlos "Mosquito" Domingos Massoni, Washington "Dodi" Joseph, Antônio Sucar, Bira Maciel, Marquinhos Leite, Julio Garavello, Marcel de Souza, Oscar Schmidt, Russo, and other talents. The club won the regional São Paulo State Championship seven times. They also won the Brazilian Championship national title seven times.

E.C. Sírio also won the continental South American Club Championship eight times. In addition to that, the club also won the title of the 1979 edition of the FIBA Intercontinental Cup.

Honors and titles

Worldwide
 FIBA Intercontinental Cup
 Champions (1): 1979 
 Runners-up (2): 1973, 1981

Continental
 South American Club Championship
 Champions (8 - record): 1961, 1968, 1970, 1971, 1972, 1978, 1979, 1984
 Runners-up (1): 1980

National
 Brazilian Championship
 Champions (7): 1968, 1970, 1972, 1978, 1979, 1983, 1989
 Runners-up (4): 1969, 1971, 1981 (II), 1987

Regional
 São Paulo State Championship
 Champions (7): 1959, 1962, 1967, 1970, 1971, 1978, 1979
 Runners-up (8): 1961, 1963, 1968, 1969, 1977, 1983, 1986, 1988

Notable players

  Eduardo Agra
  Friedrich Wilhelm Braun
  Wagner da Silva
  Marcel de Souza
  Maury de Souza
  Carlos Domingos Massoni
  Rolando Ferreira
  Julio Garavello
  Zé Geraldo
  Jorge Guerra
  Nilo Guimarães
  Ricardo Guimarães
  Washington Joseph
  Marquinhos Leite
  Bira Maciel
  Sílvio Malvezi
  Luiz Cláudio Menon
  Amaury Pasos
  Hélio Rubens
  José Carlos Saiani
  Oscar Schmidt
  Milton Setrini
  Antônio Salvador Sucar
  Gerson Victalino
  Marcelo Vido
  Paulinho Villas Boas
  Tito Horford
  Arturo Guerrero
  Winford Boynes
  Ray Townsend

Head coaches
  Cláudio Mortari

Other sports
Esporte Clube Sírio's football department was disbanded in 1935.

References

External links
Official website 
Latinbasket.com Team Profile

Basketball teams in Brazil
Basketball teams in São Paulo